Kawanoki Dam  is an earthfill dam located in Hiroshima Prefecture in Japan. The dam is used for irrigation.  The dam impounds about 4  ha of land when full and can store 210 thousand cubic meters of water. The construction of the dam was started on 1974 and completed in 1984.

References

Dams in Hiroshima Prefecture